In psychotherapy and mental health, enabling has a positive sense of empowering individuals, or a negative sense of encouraging dysfunctional behavior.

Positive
As a positive term, "enabling" is similar to empowerment, and describes patterns of interaction which allow individuals to develop and grow. These patterns may be on any scale, for example within the family, or in wider society as "enabling acts" designed to empower some group, or create a new authority for a (usually governmental) body.

Negative
In a negative sense, "enabling" can describe dysfunctional behavior approaches that are intended to help resolve a specific problem but in fact may perpetuate or exacerbate the problem. A common theme of enabling in this latter sense is that third parties take responsibility or blame, or make accommodations for a person's harmful conduct (often with the best of intentions, or from fear or insecurity which inhibits action). The practical effect is that the person themselves does not have to do so, and is shielded from awareness of the harm it may do, and the need or pressure to change.

Codependency
Codependency is a theory that attempts to explain imbalanced relationships in which one person enables another person's self-destructive behavior such as addiction, poor mental health, immaturity, irresponsibility, or under-achievement.

Enabling may be observed in the relationship between a person with a substance use disorder and their partner, spouse or a parent. Enabling behaviors may include making excuses that prevent others from holding the person accountable, or cleaning up messes that occur in the wake of their impaired judgment. Enabling may prevent psychological growth in the person being enabled, and may contribute to negative symptoms in the enabler. Enabling may be driven by concern for retaliation, or fear of consequence to the person with the substance use disorder, such as job loss, injury or suicide. A parent may allow an addicted adult child to live at home without contributing to the household such as by helping with chores, and be manipulated by the child's excuses, emotional attacks, and threats of self-harm.

Narcissists and abusers

In the context of narcissists or abusers, enablers are distinct from flying monkeys (proxy abusers). Enablers allow or cover for the narcissist's or abuser's own bad behavior while flying monkeys actually perpetrate bad behavior to a third party on their behalf. Padilla et al. (2007), in analyzying destructive leadership, distinguished between conformers and colluders, in which the latter are those who actively participate in the destructive behavior.

Emotional abuse is a brainwashing method that over time can turn someone into an enabler. While the narcissist often plays the victim, it is quite common for the true victim to believe that he or she is responsible for the abuse \and thus must adapt and adjust to it.

Examples of enabling in an abusive context are as follows: 
 Making excuses for another's violent rages.
 Cleaning up someone else's mess.
 Hiding an abuser's dysfunctional actions from public view.
 Absorbing the negative consequences of someone else's bad choices.
 Paying off another person's debts.
 Refusing to confront or protect oneself when exposed to physical, emotional or verbal assault.
 Regurgitating the abuser's 'facts' / version of reality to a third party without seeking evidence.
 Revictimising the abuser's other victims with narcissistic-type behaviour such as gaslighting, denial, or scapegoating. 
 Triangulation (playing the part in an abuse triangle as either victim or protector, but never seeing themselves as perpetrator).
 Keeping secrets for the narcissist such as affairs, extramarital children, alcoholism, gambling, incest.
 Projecting / passing on their own shame (the shame projected on to them by the narcissist) to third parties.
 Giving up/over knowledge of their finances to be taken care of by the narcissist (oftentimes resulting in considerable debt).

See also
 Personal boundaries
 Sycophancy

References

Motivation
Counseling
Behavior modification
Behavioural syndromes associated with physiological disturbances and physical factors
Interpersonal relationships
Narcissism
Abuse